"One Pound Fish", often stylised as "£1 Fish", is a novelty song performed by British-based Pakistani fish trader and recording artist Muhammad Shahid Nazir, credited as One Pound Fish Man. It was released on 7 December 2012 for download in the United Kingdom, reaching number 28 in the UK Singles Chart, number 4 in the UK Dance Chart, and number 1 in the UK Asian Chart.

Background
Following brief employment at a pound shop, Muhammad Shahid Nazir, a Pakistani immigrant to UK, originating from the town of Pattoki in Punjab, who had settled in East London, began work on a fish stall at Queen's Market, Upton Park where his employer instructed him to use a trader's call to attract customers. He soon composed the song "One Pound Fish".

It became an internet smash and a viral video after passing customers uploaded videos of Nazir performing his song onto YouTube.

A music video to accompany the release of "One Pound Fish" was first released on 10 December 2012 at a total length of two minutes and thirty-six seconds. It featured Bollywood-style dancers and an appearance from former weather forecaster Michael Fish.

In 2012 it was rumoured that Nazir had been deported to Pakistan after his visa had expired, although this was not the case.

Covers and remixes
The song has since been covered by many artists including Alesha Dixon. Mindless Behavior performed it live on the BBC Radio 1Xtra Breakfast Show, and Timbaland, Boy Better Know and The Kiffness made remixes sampling from the song.

Chart performance

Release history

References

External links
 

2012 debut singles
Warner Music Group singles
Internet memes introduced in 2012
Novelty songs
Songs based on jingles
Songs about fish
2012 songs